Johnny Thomas may refer to:

Johnny Thomas (cornerback) (born 1964), American football player
Johnny Thomas (wide receiver) (born 1989), Canadian football player
Johnny Thomas (American football, born 1956), former American football player and coach
Johnny Thomas (footballer) (1926–2006), association football player for Swindon Town, Chester City and Stockport County
Johnny Thomas (rugby) (died 1954), Welsh rugby union and rugby league footballer who played in the 1900s, 1910s and 1920s

See also
John Thomas (disambiguation)